Young as You Feel is a 1940 American comedy film directed by Malcolm St. Clair and starring Jed Prouty, Spring Byington and Joan Valerie. It was part of Twentieth Century Fox's Jones Family series of films. The film's plot was similar to that of the 1931 film Young as You Feel.

Cast
 Jed Prouty as John Jones 
 Spring Byington as Mrs. John Jones  
 Joan Valerie as Bonnie Jones  
 Russell Gleason as Herbert Thompson  
 Kenneth Howell as Jack Jones  
 George Ernest as Roger Jones  
 June Carlson as Lucy Jones 
 Florence Roberts as Granny Jones  
 Billy Mahan as Bobby Jones  
 Helen Ericson as Sandra  
 George Givot as Boris Mousilvitch  
 Marvin Stephens as Tommy McGuire  
 Harlan Briggs as Dr. Kinsley  
 Harry Shannon as Gillespie  
 Jack Carson as Norcross  
 Guy Rapp as Baron Gonzales de Cordoba  
 Gladys Blake as Mrs. Blake  
 Esther Brodelet as Polly Marshall 
 John Elliott as Ambulance doctor 
 Veronica Lake as Bit part  
 Billy Lechner as Boy  
 Joan Leslie as Girl 
 John Sheehan as Fire Chief  
 Lee Shumway as Policeman  
 Bruce Warren as Norcross representative  
 Irma Wilson as Brenda Walters

References

Bibliography
 Bernard A. Drew. Motion Picture Series and Sequels: A Reference Guide. Routledge, 2013.

External links
 

1940 films
1940 comedy films
1940s English-language films
American comedy films
Films directed by Malcolm St. Clair
20th Century Fox films
American black-and-white films
1940s American films